"Lukey's Boat" is a comical folk song originating from the east coast of Newfoundland. Given its metre, it may have derived from a sea shanty.

There are many minor variations of the song, depending on the singer; however it is essentially about the characteristics of the title boat, with the last few stanzas about Lukey returning home to find his wife dead and buried (who appears not to grieve her much, as he'll have another "in the spring of the year"). The earliest printed version was in "Ballads from Nova Scotia" (1932) by Helen Creighton, listed as "Loakie's Boat".

It was recorded as "Lukey" by Great Big Sea for their 1995 album Up, by Great Big Sea with The Chieftains for the 1998 album Fire in the Kitchen, by Fiddler's Green, a German folk band, for their 2007 album Drive Me Mad!, and The Kreellers on Sixth and Porter released in 2008.

Used as a theme song for Australian comedian Lukey Bolland.

Also recorded in 1966 by John White, from St John's, Newfoundland.

References
"Published in Gerald S. Doyle's Old-Time Songs And Poetry Of Newfoundland: Songs Of The People From The Days Of Our Forefathers (Second Edition, p.71, 1940; Third edition, p.40, 1955). Also published on pp.24-25 of Songs Of Newfoundland, a complementary booklet of lyrics to twenty-one songs distributed by the Bennett Brewing Co. Ltd., of St. John's, NL, with the cooperation of the Gerald S. Doyle Song Book from which these lyrics were obtained." * Lukey's Boat by Great Big Sea

Newfoundland and Labrador folk songs
Great Big Sea songs
1995 songs
1998 songs
Comedy songs
Canadian folk songs
Songs about boats